Chaetolopha oxyntis is a moth in the family Geometridae. It is found in Australia (Queensland, New South Wales and Victoria).

The wingspan is about 40 mm. The wings are pale brown with a dark brown triangle outlined in white on the forewings.

The larvae probably feed on Polypodiophyta species.

References

Moths described in 1891
Larentiinae
Moths of Australia